Lyrical Symphony -Live- is a live album by Versailes, released on September 1, 2010. It is the live version of their EP Lyrical Sympathy, but also contains the bonus studio track "Sforzando", which was previously only available on the omnibus album Cross Gate 2008 -Chaotic Sorrow-.

Track listing 

 "Sforzando -Original Version-" is not live, it's the version released in Cross Gate 2008 -Chaotic Sorrow. The title is also misleading as this is the only version released.

References

Versailles (band) live albums
2010 live albums